Here and Now is the seventh studio album by Canadian rock band Nickelback, and is their last to be released on Roadrunner Records. The album was released on November 21, 2011. It is the follow-up to their multi-platinum selling Dark Horse in 2008. On September 26, the band officially released two singles, "When We Stand Together" and "Bottoms Up". Both songs were made available for download on September 27, 2011. The first track of the record, "This Means War", was released on November 10, 2011 as the third single. The album's cover features Vancouver's Gastown Steam Clock. The clock is set at 11:21, the date the album was released.

The album debuted at number two on the US Billboard 200 after selling approximately 227,000 copies in its first week, just 0.18% below the number one spot, Michael Bublé's Christmas. Nickelback toured in support of the album on their Here and Now Tour. As of October 2013, the album has sold two million copies worldwide.

Reception

Critical response

According to Metacritic, the album has received an average review score of 51/100, based on 9 reviews, indicating "mixed reviews". Consequence of Sound awarded the album two stars, out of a possible 5, stating that "Here and Now might prove to be a step above the last effort, but likewise a step high enough to hang its creators on a barn rafter." Conversely, Canadian music and entertainment website Rockstar Weekly called it "far and away, the best Canadian album of 2011."

Commercial performance
The album has topped both the HMV Canada CD sales chart and the US iTunes Album chart in its first week of sales. The album debuted at  number 10 in the UK charts. On December 16, 2011, the album was certified gold by the British Phonographic Industry (BPI) for shipments of 100,000 copies in the UK.

Track listing
The track list of the album was revealed on September 26, 2011.

Japan Bonus Tracks

Personnel
Musicians
Chad Kroeger – lead vocals, rhythm guitar, production
Ryan Peake – lead guitar, piano, backing vocals, production
Mike Kroeger – bass, production 
Daniel Adair – drums, backing vocals, production
Additional personnel
Brian Howes - production, additional guitar
Rob Dawson - acoustic guitar on "Lullaby"
Joey Moi – production, engineering
Jay Van Poederooyen – engineering, mixing
Scott Cooke – engineering, editing
Chris Lord-Alge – mixing
Randy Staub – mixing
Keith Armstrong – mixing assistance
Zach Blackstone – mixing assistance
Nik Karpen – mixing assistance
Ted Jensen - mastering
Gail Marowitz – art direction
Travis Shinn – photography
Brennan Brousseau – cover artwork

Charts

Weekly charts

Year-end charts

Decade-end charts

Certifications

Appearances
The song "This Means War" was featured as downloadable content for the video game Rock Band in 2011.

References

Nickelback albums
2011 albums
Roadrunner Records albums
Universal Music Canada albums
Albums produced by Joey Moi